Mielkella is a Neotropical butterfly genus in the family Nymphalidae. The genus is monotypic containing the single species Mielkella singularis from Guatemala and Mexico.

References

Morphinae
Nymphalidae of South America
Monotypic butterfly genera
Nymphalidae genera
Taxa named by Gustav Weymer